Goverdhan Assembly constituency is  one of the 403 constituencies of the Uttar Pradesh Legislative Assembly,  India. It is a part of the Mathura district and one  of the five assembly constituencies in the Mathura Lok Sabha constituency. First election in this assembly constituency was held in 1957 after the "DPACO (1956)" (delimitation order) was passed in 1956. After the "Delimitation of Parliamentary and Assembly Constituencies Order" was passed in 2008, the constituency was assigned identification number 83.

Wards  / Areas
Extent  of Goverdhan Assembly constituency is KC Goverdhan, PCs Konai, Basauti,  Barhauta, Ral, Jikhangaon, Tosh, Jachonda, Maura, Bati, Chhatikara, Jaint,  Maghera, Atas Bangar, Sunrakh Bangar, Dhaurera Bangar, Kota of Vrindaban KC,  KC Kosi Khurd, PCs Sonsa, Madhurikund, Satoha Asgarpur, Junsuti, Uncha Gaon,  Shahpur Chainpur, Umari, Tarsi, Usphar of Mathura KC, PCs Koyala Alipur,  Karnawal, Bad, Bhainsa, Chhargaon, Sersa, Bhudrasu, Pura, Bhahai, Beri of Bad  KC, Goverdhan NP, Radhakund NP & Sonkh NP of Mathura Tehsil.

Members of the Legislative Assembly

Election results

2022

2017

See also
Mathura district
Mathura Lok Sabha constituency
Sixteenth Legislative Assembly of Uttar Pradesh
Uttar Pradesh Legislative Assembly

References

External links
 

Assembly constituencies of Uttar Pradesh
Mathura district
Constituencies established in 1956